The South Kermadec Ridge Seamounts are a continuation of the volcanic island arc, formed at the convergent boundary where the Pacific Plate subducts under the Indo-Australian Plate. The subducting Pacific Plate created the Kermadec Trench, the second deepest submarine trench, to the east of the islands. The seamounts lie along the western aspect of the undersea Kermadec Ridge, which runs southwest from the Kermadec Islands towards the North Island of New Zealand and northeast towards Tonga (Kermadec-Tonga Arc). 

This area of the Kermadec Arc - Havre Trough is a relatively young oceanic arc-back-arc system as it became active in the Quaternary. The seamounts include:

 Speight Knoll 
 Oliver Knoll 
 Haungaroa Seamount 
 Kuiwai Seamount 
 Cole Seamount 
 Ngātoroirangi Seamount 
 Sonne Seamount 
 Kibblewhite Seamount  
 Gill Seamount   
Situated in the middle of a deep basin (3000m deep) to the west of Kibblewhite and actually closer to the Lau-Colville Ridge than the Kermadec Ridge
 Yokosuka Seamount    
To west of Brothers situated on an elevated basal plateau (2500m deep)
 Rapuhia Seamount   
To west of Brothers
 Gilianes Seamount   
To west of Brothers
 Brothers Seamount   
 Healy   
 Two calderas in a  elongated complex with the largest caldera being 3 x 4 km
This is believed to have been formed in the 1360 ± 75 CE eruption
 Cotton   
Satellitic cone to Healy at south west end of complex 
 The Silents
 Silent I Seamount
 Silent II Seamount   
 The Rumbles
 Rumble I Seamount   
 Rumble II West Seamount   
 Rumble II East Seamount  
 Rumble III Seamount   
 Largest of the chain of Rumble seamounts 
Eruptions on:
9 July 1958
16 January 1963
15 October 1973
15 June 1986
2 July 2008
 Rumble IV Seamount  
 Rumble V Seamount  
 Lillie Seamount 
Lillie is north of Rumbles IV and V
 Tangaroa Seamount   
 Clark Seamount   
 Whakatāne Seamount

References

Seamount chains
Seamounts of New Zealand
Volcanism of New Zealand
Ecoregions of New Zealand
Geography of the Kermadec Islands
Volcanoes of New Zealand